Metro North Hospital and Health Service, known as Metro North HHS or as Metro North Health, is the most populous public health district in Queensland and the overarching health service for the statewide tertiary facility, the Royal Brisbane and Women's Hospital. The service operates several hospitals, dental facilities, and community health services in Brisbane and the surrounds, including the Royal Brisbane and Women's Hospital and The Prince Charles Hospital, and covers the area north of the Brisbane River through to Kilcoy. Metro North Health is part of Queensland Health, and is paired with Metro South Hospital and Health Service.

As a HHS under Queensland's public health system legislation, Metro North Health is under direction from its Hospital and Health Board. The board has certain powers and requirements under the Hospital and Health Boards Act 2011 and Hospital and Health Boards Regulation 2012, which relate to its functions under Australia's universal health system and the 2011 National Health Reform Agreement.

Hospital and Health Board

Facilities

Herston Health Precinct

Royal Brisbane and Women's Hospital 

The Royal Brisbane & Women's Hospital (RBWH) is the largest public hospital in Queensland, with a total of 955 beds and almost 10,000 staff. RBWH provides specialist inpatient and outpatient services in all major specialities, including cancer care and maternity, as well as state-wide emergency and trauma services. As the state tertiary referral hospital, RBWH accounts for approximately 10% of all public hospital services in Queensland and provides services to patients from New South Wales and the Northern Territory where they are not available locally.

From 1 October 2022 to 1 January 2023, RBWH provided 145,126 specialist outpatient appointments, saw 21,952 patients through the Emergency and Trauma Centre, and performed 2,724 elective surgery procedures.

Surgical, Treatment and Rehabilitation Service

Queensland Cancer Centre

The Prince Charles Hospital

Redcliffe Hospital

Caboolture Hospital

Kilcoy Hospital

Woodford Correctional Health Service 
Woodford Correctional Health Service is the Metro North outreach service at the Woodford Correctional Centre. Under an agreement with Queensland Corrective Service, Queensland Health through Metro North provides primary health services to inmates and staff.

Community and Oral Health 
The Community and Oral Health (COH) Directorate operates a large number of community health centres, post-acute care services, rehabilitation and residential facilities:

 North Lakes Health Precinct
 Brighton Health Campus
 Caboolture King St Community Health Centre
 North West Community Health Centre
 Nundah Community Health Centre
 Pine Rivers Community Health Centre
 Redcliffe Community Health Centre
 Chermside Community Health Centre
 Zillmere Residential Transitional Care
 Cooinda House
 Halwyn Centre

The Rosemount Hospital Campus at Cartwright Street, Windsor, used to be a specialist rehabilitation and geriatrics service before these services were transferred to the new Surgical, Treatment and Rehabilitation Service. The campus has since been converted in part to corporate and support service offices, such as office space for the Metro North Public Health Unit. Aspley Community Centre does not provide health services anymore, and instead houses the Central Patient Intake Unit.

References

External links 
 
 

Medical and health organisations based in Queensland